The 97th Guards Mechanized Brigade was a rifle, and then a motor-rifle division of the Soviet Union's Army, before becoming a mechanized brigade of the Ukrainian Ground Forces, based in Slavuta in western Ukraine.

The full name of the division was the "97th Guards Poltava Motor-Rifle Division, Red Banner, Suvorov's, Bogdan Khmelnitsky".

History

World War II 
The division was formed in August–September 1941 as the 343rd Rifle Division near the city of Stavropol. Over the next twelve months it was assigned to the 56th, 6th, 9th, 21st, and 24th Armies.
The division took part in the defensive operations at Rostov, then in the Rostov and Barvenko-Lozovaia offensive operations. Later, it fought in the Second Battle of Kharkov, then fled eastward to take part in defensive operations near Stalingrad. On July 17, 1942, when the 21st Army joined the Stalingrad Front, the division had 2,795 men and fewer than 20 artillery pieces. After October, 1942, it was assigned to the 66th Army, which later became the 5th Guards Army.

On May 4, 1943, the division was re-designated as the 97th Guards Rifle Division. Its order of battle was as follows:
 289th Guards Rifle Regiment from 1151st Rifle Regiment
 292nd Guards Rifle Regiment from 1153rd Rifle Regiment
 294th Guards Rifle Regiment from 1155th Rifle Regiment
 232nd Guards Artillery Regiment from 903rd Artillery Regiment
 104th Guards Antitank Battalion from 567th Antitank Battalion
 110th Guards Sapper Battalion from 620th Sapper Battalion
 141st Guards Signal Battalion from 791st Signal Battalion
 100th Guards Reconnaissance Company from 402nd Reconnaissance Company
The day before its re-designation the division was assigned to the newly-formed 33rd Guards Rifle Corps. On May 2, the commander of the division, Matvei Usenko, was promoted to the rank of Major General. Just ten days later he was killed after being blown up by a land mine while crossing a road in a vehicle.

The division took part in the Battle of Kursk, along with the rest of 5th Guards Army as part of the Steppe Front. Later, it fought in the liberation of left-bank Ukraine. In September, the division was awarded the 'Poltava' honorific, along with its sister divisions, the 13th and 95th Guards Rifle Divisions. In 1944 and 1945, it took part in the Kirovograd, Uman-Botoshany, Lvov-Sandomir, Sandomir-Silesia, Upper and Lower Silesia, Berlin, and Prague offensives. The division ended the war in 32nd Guards Rifle Corps, still in 5th Guards Army.

Postwar 
After World War II, the division was stationed in Austria, with the Central Group of Forces, where it remained until 1946. During that time, the division belonged to the 5th Guards Army. After its relocation to Slavuta, it became part of the 13th Army. After it moved to Slavuta, the division was downsized into the 28th Separate Guards Rifle Brigade, but became a division again on 16 September 1949. In 1957, it was reorganized from a Rifle into a Motor Rifle division. After the collapse of the Soviet Union, the division was reorganized into a Brigade, which continued to exist until November 2004, when it was disbanded.

Order of battle
During the late 1980s, the division included the following units.
110th Tank Regiment
289th Guards Motor Rifle Regiment
292nd Guards Motor Rifle Regiment
294th Guards Motor Rifle Regiment
232nd Guards Self-Propelled Artillery Regiment
1094th Guards Anti-Aircraft Rocket Regiment

Awards
September 1943 received the honorific "Poltava"
19?? received Order of Bogdan Khmelnitsky
19?? received Order of Suvorov
19?? received the Order of the Red Banner

References

Sources

Further reading
I.A. Samchuk, “Guards from Poltava" (Moscow, Voenizdat, 1965) (Russian)
"World War II, Soviet Encyclopaedia, 1985, p. 573 [М. М. Козлов. Великая Отечественная война 1941-1945: Энциклопедия. — М: «Советская энциклопедия», 1985. — С. 573. — 832 с. — 105 000 экз.]
Феськов В. И., Калашников К. А., Голиков В. И. Глава 2. Стрелковые и воздушно-десантные войска, укрепленные районы Красной Армии в годы Великой Отечественной войны // Красная Армия в победах и поражениях 1941-1945 гг.. — Томск: Издательство Томского университета, 2003. — 619 с. — .
Чуйков В. И. Сражение века. — М.: Советская Россия, 1975. — 317 с.
Жадов А. С. Четыре года войны. — М.: Воениздат, 1978. — 334 с.
Военный энциклопедический словарь. — под. ред. Н. В. Огаркова. — Военное издательство, 1983. — С. 573. — 863 с. — ISBN ББК 68я2 В63.
Родимцев А. И., Гвардейцы стояли насмерть, 2 изд., М., 1973

External links
Matvei Alekseevich Usenko

Mechanised infantry brigades of Ukraine
Military units and formations established in 1941
Military units and formations established in the 1990s
Military units and formations disestablished in 2004
Military units and formations awarded the Order of the Red Banner